Middle European League for the season 2012-13 was the first season of the Middle European League.

Team information

Regular season

Final four

External links
Round-up: Round 8 in Middle European League, lovewomensbasketball.com
Good Angels Kosice go undefeated to win the first edition of Middle European League, lovewomensbasketball.com
 Premiere MEL's title remains in Koice, eurobasket.com

2012-13
2012–13 in European women's basketball leagues
2012–13 in Slovak basketball
2012–13 in Hungarian basketball
2012–13 in Croatian basketball